Beaumont Centre is a neighborhood and major retail and office park in southwestern Lexington, Kentucky, United States. Its boundaries are New Circle Road to the north, the older Harrods Hill neighborhood to the south, Man o' War Boulevard to the west, and Harrodsburg Road to the east.  The area was one of the last undeveloped areas off New Circle Road, development began in the early 1990s.

New Circle Road (Lexington's inner beltway) blocks direct access between Beaumont Centre and nearby the Beaumont Park or Garden Springs neighborhoods.

Venue

MoonDance Amphitheater was built in 2010 by developers Tim and Andy Haymaker. Located in the heart of Beaumont Centre circle, this performance and event venue offers a diverse lineup of movies, food fairs, and summer concerts, with lawn seating.  Known for its live music on the grounds on warm summer nights.  The events feature anywhere from local to national artistic talent.

Craft beer and food trucks are onsite and available at most events.  There are also many restaurants in the area.

This amphitheater is available to rent for events anywhere starting at 10am to 9pm. Check out their Facebook page for pricing and most recent updates.

Neighborhood statistics

 Area: 
 Population: 2,404
 Population density: 2,186 people per square mile
 Median household income (2010): $96,764

References

Neighborhoods in Lexington, Kentucky